Jan Pecka is a former Czechoslovak slalom canoeist who competed in the 1950s. He won two medals at the ICF Canoe Slalom World Championships with a gold (C-1 team: 1951) and a bronze (C-2 team: 1953).

References

Czechoslovak male canoeists
Possibly living people
Year of birth missing
Medalists at the ICF Canoe Slalom World Championships